The indoor men's singles competition at the 1912 Summer Olympics was part of the tennis program for the games.

Draw

Finals

Top half

Bottom half

References
 
 
  ITF, 2008 Olympic Tennis Event Media Guide

Men's indoor singles
Men's events at the 1912 Summer Olympics